Moll Anthony, aka Mary Lesson (–1878), was an Irish bean feasa (wise-woman) who lived at Hill of the Grange, but apparently originally from the Red Hills, County Kildare. She was called after her father, Anthony Dunne. She was buried in Milltown, County Kildare, in 1878.

Moll was able to cure both people and animals with potions she created from particular herbs. Each potion was given in three porter bottles, two of which she gave at her first visit, the third bottle been given at the second visit. The charge was half a crown a bottle. According to a website,

Folklore

Lord Walter Fitzgerald wrote of her

He furthermore stated that "Some believed that Moll Anthony of the Red Hills was a sort of reincarnation of a young dead girl. And that Moll's spirit had been left by the fairies in replace of the young girls dead body in the coffin." His account was as follows:

Fitzgerald claimed that Moll Anthony's name was Mary Leeson, that she died in 1878 and that her cure passed on to a James Leeson her son.  This man lived in a comfortable slated house on the Hill of the Grange on the site of Moll's former mud-walled house.  Local people accept that James had the cure and the house which still clings to the side of Grange Hill was his.

Tombstone

Two side-by-side tombstones in the graveyard of Milltown, County Kildare, read.

See also

 Biddy Early
 Cunning folk in Britain

References

 "How Moll Anthony came into being", Walter Fitzgerald, Journal of the Kildare Archaeological Society, Vol. VIII, p. 79.
 Wise-woman of Kildare: Moll Anthony and popular tradition in the east of Ireland, Erin Kraus, Four Courts Press, Dublin, October 2011. .

External links

 http://www.shee-eire.com/Magic&Mythology/Fairylore/Healers,Wise-Ones&Charmers/Moll-Anthony-of-Kildare/Page1.htm
 http://askaboutireland.ie/reading-room/history-heritage/folklore-of-ireland/folklore-folk-tales-and-c/moll-anthony-of-the-redhi/

People from County Kildare
19th-century Irish people
Cunning folk
19th-century Irish women